The 1982 Tipperary Senior Hurling Championship was the 92nd staging of the Tipperary Senior Hurling Championship since its establishment by the Tipperary County Board in 1887.

Borris-Ileigh were the defending champions.

Moycarkey-Borris won the championship after a 2-12 to 0-11 defeat of Roscrea in a final replay at Semple Stadium. It was their 11th championship title overall and their first title since 1940.

Results

Quarter-finals

Semi-finals

Final

Championship statistics

Top scorers

Overall

In a single game

References

Tipperary
Tipperary Senior Hurling Championship